Nicholas John Collison (born October 26, 1980) is an American former professional basketball player who is a special assistant for the Oklahoma City Thunder of the National Basketball Association (NBA). He spent his entire career with the Seattle SuperSonics, later renamed the Thunder in 2008. Collison was drafted by the SuperSonics in the first round of the 2003 NBA draft and retired as a member of the Thunder in 2018. As a college player, he went to two Final Fours with the Kansas Jayhawks.

Early life and high school career
Collison was born in Orange City, Iowa and grew up in Fort Dodge and Iowa Falls. He attended Iowa Falls High School and was a McDonald's All-American in 1999.

College career
Teaming with fellow Iowan Kirk Hinrich to form one of the best duos in college basketball, Collison helped the University of Kansas reach two consecutive Final Fours (2002 and 2003). Collison finished his college career as the leading scorer in the history of the Big 12 Conference (a mark since surpassed). In 2003, the Jayhawks lost to Carmelo Anthony and the Syracuse Orange in the National Championship game, 81–78. Collison also played for the United States national team at the 2002 FIBA World Championship.

Collison's No. 4 jersey was retired by the Jayhawks on November 25, 2003 during halftime of the Kansas-Michigan State game in recognition of his achievements over his four-year career (2002–03 Player of the Year, consensus first-team All-America, Big 12 Player of the Year).

Professional career

Seattle SuperSonics / Oklahoma City Thunder (2003–2018)

Draft year injury and relocation (2003–2008) 

Collison was selected by the Seattle SuperSonics with the 12th overall pick in the 2003 NBA draft, but missed the 2003–04 season with injuries to both shoulders. He made his NBA debut on November 3, 2004, recording two points, five rebounds and two assists in a 114–84 loss to the Los Angeles Clippers. Collison appeared in all 82 games in the 2004-05 season, averaging 5.6 points and 4.6 rebounds in 17.0 minutes per game. He played in all 82 games for a second time during the 2006–07 season. On January 9, 2007, Collison had a career-best game with 29 points and 21 rebounds in a 113–102 loss to the Phoenix Suns. In 2008, the franchise relocated to Oklahoma City and rebranded as the Thunder.

Finals appearance and later years (2008–2018) 
On December 19, 2010, Collison scored a season high 19 points and added eight rebounds in a 113–120 loss to the Phoenix Suns. In the game, he also drew his 15th charge of the season, a majority of the 22 charges the Thunder had drawn as a team to that point in the season. That postseason, on May 15, 2011, Collison helped  the Thunder to a Western Conference Semifinals Game 7 win over the Memphis Grizzlies, with 8 points and a playoff career high 12 rebounds. The next round, Collison and the Thunder lost to the Dallas Mavericks in the Conference Finals.

In 2012, Collison helped the Thunder make the leap to the next level, and reach the NBA Finals, where they lost in five games to the Miami Heat, whom were led by Collison's fellow 2003 draftees LeBron James, Dwyane Wade, and Chris Bosh.

On February 3, 2015, Collison signed a two-year, $7.5 million contract extension with the Thunder.

On July 21, 2017, Collison re-signed with the Thunder to a one-year, minimum salary deal.

Collison's final NBA game was played on April 11th, 2018 in a 137 - 123 win over the Memphis Grizzlies where he recorded 1 point and 1 rebound.

Retirement
On May 10, 2018, Collison announced his retirement from professional basketball. On January 12, 2019, the Thunder announced that they would be retiring Collison's No. 4 jersey, becoming the first number retired by the Thunder.

Post-playing career
Following his retirement as a player, Collison joined Thunder in the position of basketball operations representative. On August 10, 2021, he was promoted to the position of special assistant to executive Vice President and general manager.

Personal life
After the Sonics relocated to Oklahoma City, Collison continued to make his home in Seattle.

Collison appeared on the cover of the 989 Sports video game NCAA Final Four 2004. The game was released on November 11, 2003 for the PlayStation 2.

Collison has a daughter named Emma. His younger brother, Michael, played college basketball for their father's alma mater, Briar Cliff University in Sioux City, Iowa.

NBA career statistics

Regular season

|-
| style="text-align:left;"|
| style="text-align:left;"|Seattle
| 82 || 4 || 17.0 || .537 || .000 || .703 || 4.6 || .4 || .4 || .6 || 5.6
|-
| style="text-align:left;"|
| style="text-align:left;"|Seattle
| 66 || 27 || 21.9 || .525 || .000 || .699 || 5.6 || 1.1 || .3 || .5 || 7.5
|-
| style="text-align:left;"|
| style="text-align:left;"|Seattle
| 82 || 56 || 29.0 || .500 || .000 || .774 || 8.1 || 1.0 || .6 || .8 || 9.6
|-
| style="text-align:left;"|
| style="text-align:left;"|Seattle
| 78 || 35 || 28.5 || .502 || .000 || .737 || 9.4 || 1.4 || .6 || .8 || 9.8
|-
| style="text-align:left;"|
| style="text-align:left;"|Oklahoma City
| 71 || 40 || 25.8 || .568 || .000 || .721 || 6.9 || .9 || .7 || .7 || 8.2
|-
| style="text-align:left;"|
| style="text-align:left;"|Oklahoma City
| 75 || 5 || 20.8 || .589 || .250 || .692 || 5.1 || .5 || .5 || .6 || 5.9
|-
| style="text-align:left;"|
| style="text-align:left;"|Oklahoma City
| 71 || 2 || 21.5 || .566 || – || .753 || 4.5 || 1.0 || .6 || .4 || 4.6
|-
| style="text-align:left;"|
| style="text-align:left;"|Oklahoma City
| 63 || 0 || 20.7 || .597|| .000 || .710 || 4.3 || 1.3 || .5 || .4 || 4.5
|-
| style="text-align:left;"|
| style="text-align:left;"|Oklahoma City
| 81 || 2 || 19.5 || .595 || .000 || .769 || 4.1 || 1.5 || .6 || .4 || 5.1
|-
| style="text-align:left;"|
| style="text-align:left;"|Oklahoma City
| 81 || 0 || 16.7 || .556 || .235 || .710 || 3.6 || 1.3 || .4 || .3 || 4.2
|-
| style="text-align:left;"|
| style="text-align:left;"|Oklahoma City
| 66 || 2 || 16.7 || .419 || .267 || .692 || 3.8 || 1.4 || .5 || .4 || 4.1
|-
| style="text-align:left;"|
| style="text-align:left;"|Oklahoma City
| 59 || 4 || 11.8 || .459 || .000 || .697 || 2.9 || .9 || .3 || .3 || 2.1
|-
| style="text-align:left;"|
| style="text-align:left;"|Oklahoma City
| 20 || 0 || 6.4 || .609 || 000 ||.625 || 1.6 || .5 || .1 || .1 || 1.7
|-
| style="text-align:left;"|
| style="text-align:left;"|Oklahoma City
| 15 || 0 || 5.0 || .684 || – || .385 || 1.3 || .3 || .0 || .0 || 2.1
|-class="sortbottom"
| style="text-align:center;" colspan="2"|Career
| 910 || 177 || 20.4 || .534 || .208 || .723 || 5.2 || 1.0 || .5 || .5 || 5.9

Playoffs

|-
| style="text-align:left;"|2005
| style="text-align:left;"|Seattle
| 11 || 0 || 19.8 || .607 || 1.000 || .630 || 5.0 || .5 || .3 || .5 || 8.4
|-
| style="text-align:left;"|2010
| style="text-align:left;"|Oklahoma City
| 6 || 0 || 21.5 || .333 || .000 || .429 || 4.7 || .3 || .8 || .2 || 3.2
|-
| style="text-align:left;"|2011
| style="text-align:left;"|Oklahoma City
| 17 || 0 || 24.3 || .632 || .000 || .783 || 5.8 || .9 || .9 || .9 || 6.7
|-
| style="text-align:left;"|2012
| style="text-align:left;"|Oklahoma City
| 20 || 0 || 16.6 || .647 || .000 || .429 || 3.4 || 1.0 || .6 || .3 || 3.5
|-
| style="text-align:left;"|2013
| style="text-align:left;"|Oklahoma City
| 11 || 0 || 16.2 || .468 || .000 || .917 || 4.6 || 1.1 || .5 || 1.0 || 5.0
|-
| style="text-align:left;"|2014
| style="text-align:left;"|Oklahoma City
| 17 || 2 || 10.8 || .414 || .400 || .700 || 2.2 || .8 || .2 || .4 || 1.9
|-
| style="text-align:left;"|2016
| style="text-align:left;"|Oklahoma City
| 9 || 0 || 8.8 || .667 || .000 || .500 || 1.2 || .6 || .9 || .0 || 1.0
|- class="sortbottom"
| style="text-align:center;" colspan="2"|Career
| 91 || 2 || 16.8 || .558 || .429 || .682 || 3.8 || .8 || .6 || .5 || 4.3

See also

 List of NCAA Division I men's basketball players with 2000 points and 1000 rebounds
 List of NBA players who have spent their entire career with one franchise

References

External links

 Nick Collison at nba.com

1980 births
Living people
All-American college men's basketball players
American men's basketball players
Basketball players from Iowa
Centers (basketball)
Kansas Jayhawks men's basketball players
McDonald's High School All-Americans
National Basketball Association players with retired numbers
Oklahoma City Thunder players
Parade High School All-Americans (boys' basketball)
People from Iowa Falls, Iowa
People from Orange City, Iowa
Power forwards (basketball)
Seattle SuperSonics draft picks
Seattle SuperSonics players
United States men's national basketball team players